Krzysztof „Grabaż" Grabowski (born March 13, 1965 in Piła) – Polish poet, singer, author of lyrics and music for songs by bands Pidżama Porno, Strachy na Lachy, Ręce Do Góry and Lavina Cox.

His lyrics are functioning also as poetry – they were released for the first time in 1994 in "Welwetowe Swetry". The book contained 46 song lyrics from the bands Ręce do Góry, Pidżama Porno, and Lavina Cox and was released by Wydawnictwo Lampa i Iskra Boża. In 1997 there was a reedition of that book, containing 63 song lyrics (most of them with guitar chords). In 2008 Lampa released "Wiersze"(), a book with all the lyrics written by Grabowski.

Biography
He attended 1st Maria Curie-Skłodowska General Education Secondary School (I Liceum Ogólnokształcące im. Marii Curie-Skłodowskiej) in Piła.

After that he studied history at Adam Mickiewicz University in Poznań.

His scene debut was in 1984 in a band called Ręce do Góry.

In 1987 he established Pidżama Porno. At present Grabowski sings in Strachy na Lachy and works in a radio station Roxy FM, where he leads an evening transmission.

Awards
January 8, 2008 Paszport Polityki in popular music
March 27, 2008 prize from the Speaker of the Wielkopolska Region for artistic achievements
November 29, 2008 Gigant (Giant) of Gazeta Wyborcza.

External links
 Official site of Pidżama Porno
 Official site of Strachy Na Lachy

1965 births
Living people
People from Piła
20th-century Polish male  singers